The 2019 Internazionali di Tennis del Friuli Venezia Giulia was a professional tennis tournament played on clay courts. It was the sixteenth (men) and fourth (women) editions of the tournament which was part of the 2019 ATP Challenger Tour and the 2019 ITF Women's World Tennis Tour. It took place in Cordenons, Italy between 5 and 18 August 2019.

Men's singles main-draw entrants

Seeds

 1 Rankings are as of 5 August 2019.

Other entrants
The following players received wildcards into the singles main draw:
  Federico Arnaboldi
  Riccardo Balzerani
  Enrico Dalla Valle
  Giovanni Fonio
  Gianluigi Quinzi

The following player received entry into the singles main draw as an alternate:
  Orlando Luz

The following players received entry into the singles main draw using their ITF World Tennis Ranking:
  Francisco Cerúndolo
  Markus Eriksson
  Felipe Meligeni Alves
  Christopher O'Connell
  Sun Fajing

The following players received entry from the qualifying draw:
  Fabien Reboul
  Evgenii Tiurnev

The following player received entry as a lucky loser:
  Nicolò Inserra

Women's singles main-draw entrants

Seeds

 1 Rankings are as of 29 July 2019.

Other entrants
The following players received wildcards into the singles main draw:
  Corinna Dentoni
  Magalie Girard
  Anastasia Piangerelli
  Federica Sacco

The following players received entry into the singles main draw using their ITF World Tennis Ranking:
  Dia Evtimova
  Ioana Gașpar
  Ilona Georgiana Ghioroaie
  Vanda Lukács
  Oleksandra Oliynykova

The following players received entry from the qualifying draw:
  Federica Arcidiacono
  Nuria Brancaccio
  Rubina Marta De Ponti
  Melany Krywoj
  Manca Pislak
  Nika Radišič

Champions

Men's singles

  Christopher O'Connell def.  Jeremy Jahn 7–5, 6–2.

Women's singles
  Arantxa Rus def.  Nika Radišič, 4–6, 6–4, 6–1

Men's doubles

  Tomislav Brkić /  Ante Pavić def.  Nikola Čačić /  Antonio Šančić 6–2, 6–3.

Women's doubles
  Veronika Erjavec /  Nika Radišič def.  Martina Caregaro /  Lisa Sabino, 6–3, 7–5

References
 2019 Internazionali di Tennis del Friuli Venezia Giulia at ITFtennis.com

2019 ATP Challenger Tour
2019 ITF Women's World Tennis Tour
2019
2019 in Italian tennis
August 2019 sports events in Italy